Theodore David Holstein (Born 18 September 1915 in New York City; died 8. May 1985) was an American theoretical physicist (Solid-state physics and Atomic physics).

Holstein studied at New York University, earning a Bachelor's degree in 1935 a PhD in 1940. His thesis Passage of Neutrons through Ferromagnetic Materials was supervised by Otto Halpern. His Master's degree was earned at Columbia University in 1936. From 1941 he worked in a research lab at Westinghouse Electric Corporation.  In 1960, he left Westinghouse and became a professor at the University of Pittsburgh. In 1965 he became a professor at the University of California, Los Angeles.

With Henry Primakoff in 1940 he introduced the Holstein-Primakoff transformation. It is important for the theory of spin waves.

His most notable contribution to atomic physics was in 1947 when he was the first to treat the capture of resonance radiation in gases correctly (later applied in laser physics, astrophysics and photochemistry, but was also applied to phonons and in the solid state).

Other significant papers included the polaron (introduction of the small polaron), infrared absorption of metals, a microscopic theory of the collision drag phenomenon by Brian Pippard, Bloch Electrons in magnetic fields (Hall effect) and his review on the transport properties in an electron-phonon gas. He corrected the Förster-Dexter theory of photoinduced energy transfer between molecules and found new mechanisms for energy transfer in disordered systems.

He became a member of the American Academy of Arts and Sciences, and the National Academy of Sciences in 1976 and 1981, respectively.

Further reading

References 

1985 deaths
1915 births
Members of the United States National Academy of Sciences
Fellows of the American Academy of Arts and Sciences
University of Pittsburgh faculty
University of California, Los Angeles faculty
20th-century American physicists
Westinghouse Electric Company